Thuneri is a 2021 Indian Tamil-language horror drama film produced, written and directed by Sunil Dixon. John Vijay, Nivin Karthik and Miya Sree appear in the lead roles. Produced by Shadow Light Entertainment, it was released on 24 December 2021.

Cast 
John Vijay
Nivin Karthik
Miya Sree 
Maria Charm
Krishna Kumar
Santhosh

Release 
The film was released on 24 December 2021 across theatres in Tamil Nadu. A critic from Maalai Malar labelled the film as "scary". Newspaper Dina Thanthi also gave the film a positive review.

Critic Malini Mannath wrote "it could have turned into a watchable film for children, had the director focused on that aspect of it. Thuneri is a promising debut from a debutant maker." A reviewer from MyKollywood noted it was a "decent horror movie".

References 

2021 drama films
2020s Tamil-language films
2021 films
Indian drama films
2021 directorial debut films